The Grammy Award for Best Reggae Album is an award presented at the Grammy Awards, a ceremony that was established in 1985 and originally called the Gramophone Awards, to recording artists for quality works in the reggae music genre. Honors in several categories are presented at the ceremony annually by the National Academy of Recording Arts and Sciences of the United States to "honor artistic achievement, technical proficiency and overall excellence in the recording industry, without regard to album sales or chart position".

Originally called the Grammy Award for Best Reggae Recording, the honor was presented to artists for eligible songs or albums. The Jamaican group Black Uhuru received the first award in 1985. Beginning with the 1992 ceremony, the name of the award was changed to Best Reggae Album. Starting in 2002, awards were often presented to the engineers, mixers, and/or producers in addition to the performing artists. According to the category description guide for the 52nd Grammy Awards, eligible works are vocal or instrumental reggae albums "containing at least 51% playing time of newly recorded music", including roots reggae, dancehall and ska music.

Ziggy Marley holds the record for the most wins in this category, with seven wins as of 2017.

Recipients

{| class="wikitable"
|- bgcolor="#bebebe"
! width="7%" | Year
! width="25%" | Performing artist(s)
! width="25%" | Work
! width="35%" class=unsortable|Nominees
! width="5%" class=unsortable|Ref.
|-
! scope="row" style="text-align:center;"|1985
| Black Uhuru
| 
| 
| style="text-align:center;"|
|-
! scope="row" style="text-align:center;"|1986
| 
| 
| 
| style="text-align:center;"|
|-
! scope="row" style="text-align:center;"|1987
| Steel Pulse
| 
| 
| style="text-align:center;"|
|-
! scope="row" style="text-align:center;"|1988
| 
| 
| 
| style="text-align:center;"|
|-
! scope="row" style="text-align:center;"|1989
| Ziggy Marley and the Melody Makers
| 
| 
| style="text-align:center;"|
|-
! scope="row" style="text-align:center;"|1990
| Ziggy Marley and the Melody Makers
| 
| 
| style="text-align:center;"|
|-
! scope="row" style="text-align:center;"|1991
| Bunny Wailer
| 
| 
| style="text-align:center;"|
|-
! scope="row" style="text-align:center;"|1992
| Shabba Ranks
| 
| 
| style="text-align:center;"|
|-
! scope="row" style="text-align:center;"|1993
| Shabba Ranks
| 
| 
| style="text-align:center;"|
|-
! scope="row" style="text-align:center;"|1994
| Inner Circle
| 
| 
| style="text-align:center;"|
|-
! scope="row" style="text-align:center;"|1995
| Bunny Wailer
| 
| 
| style="text-align:center;"|
|-
! scope="row" style="text-align:center;"|1996
| Shaggy
| 
| 
| style="text-align:center;"|
|-
! scope="row" style="text-align:center;"|1997
| Bunny Wailer
| 
| 
| style="text-align:center;"|
|-
! scope="row" style="text-align:center;"|1998
| Ziggy Marley and the Melody Makers
| 
| 
| style="text-align:center;"|
|-
! scope="row" style="text-align:center;"|1999
| Sly and Robbie
| 
| 
| style="text-align:center;"|
|-
! scope="row" style="text-align:center;"|2000
| Burning Spear
| 
| 
| style="text-align:center;"|
|-
! scope="row" style="text-align:center;"|2001
| Beenie Man
| 
| 
| style="text-align:center;"|
|-
! scope="row" style="text-align:center;"|2002
| 
| 
| 
| style="text-align:center;"|
|-
! scope="row" style="text-align:center;"|2003
| 
| 
| {{smalldiv|
 Alpha Blondy – Merci
 Bounty Killer – Ghetto Dictionary: The Mystery
 Capleton – ''Still Blazin Freddie McGregor – Anything for You}}
| style="text-align:center;"|
|-
! scope="row" style="text-align:center;"|2004
| 
| 
| 
| style="text-align:center;"|
|-
! scope="row" style="text-align:center;"|2005
| Toots and the Maytals
| 
| 
| style="text-align:center;"|
|-
! scope="row" style="text-align:center;"|2006
| 
| 
| 
| style="text-align:center;"|
|-
! scope="row" style="text-align:center;"|2007
| 
| 
| 
| style="text-align:center;"|
|-
! scope="row" style="text-align:center;"|2008
| 
| 
| 
| style="text-align:center;"|
|-
! scope="row" style="text-align:center;"|2009
| Burning Spear
| 
| 
| style="text-align:center;"|
|-
! scope="row" style="text-align:center;"|2010
| 
| 
| 
| style="text-align:center;"|
|-
! scope="row" style="text-align:center;"|2011
| 
| 
| 
| style="text-align:center;"|
|-
! scope="row" style="text-align:center;"|2012
| Stephen Marley
| Revelation Pt. 1 – The Root of Life
| 
| style="text-align:center;"|
|-
! scope="row" style="text-align:center;"|2013
| Jimmy Cliff
| Rebirth
| 
| style="text-align:center;"|
|-
! scope="row" style="text-align:center;"|2014
| Ziggy Marley
| In Concert
| 
| style="text-align:center;"|
|-
! scope="row" style="text-align:center;"|2015
| Ziggy Marley
| Fly Rasta
| 
| style="text-align:center;"|
|-
! scope="row" style="text-align:center;"|2016
| Morgan Heritage 
| Strictly Roots
| 
| style="text-align:center;"|
|- 
! scope="row" style="text-align:center;"|2017
| Ziggy Marley
| Ziggy Marley
| 
| style="text-align:center;"|
|- 
! scope="row" style="text-align:center;"|2018
| Damian "Jr. Gong" Marley
| Stony Hill
| 
| style="text-align:center;"|
|- 
! scope="row" style="text-align:center;"|2019
| Sting & Shaggy
| 44/876
| 
| style="text-align:center;"|
|- 
! scope="row" style="text-align:center;"|2020
| Koffee
| Rapture
| 
| style="text-align:center;"|
|- 
! scope="row" style="text-align:center;"|2021
| Toots and the Maytals
| Got to Be Tough
| 
| style="text-align:center;"|
|-
!2022
|SOJA
|Beauty in the Silence
|
|
|-
!2023
|Kabaka Pyramid
|The Kalling
|
 Koffee - Gifted
 Sean Paul - Scorcha
 Protoje - Third Time's The Charm
 Shaggy - Com Fly Wid Mi
|
|}
 Each year is linked to the article about the Grammy Awards held that year.

2010 controversy

Buju Banton's (real name Mark Anthony Myrie) nomination for the 2010 award sparked controversy and protest due to homophobic lyrics within his music. Banton's most controversial song, released in 1988, is "Boom, Bye Bye", which "promote[s] the murder of gay men by shooting or burning". Following the artist's nomination, the Gay & Lesbian Alliance Against Defamation and the Los Angeles Gay and Lesbian Center placed an advertisement in the Daily Variety encouraging Grammy officials to denounce music that "promotes or celebrates violence against any group of people". The advertisement, which took the form of a letter signed by gay rights and civil rights activists, asserted that honoring Banton was awarding "extraordinary hateful work". The National Academy of Recording Arts and Sciences responded by insisting that artists are honored for quality music "regardless of politics". Banton has been quoted as saying that he sees "no end to the war" between himself and gay men. The 2010 award was presented to Stephen Marley. Banton was nominated in 2011 for the album Before the Dawn. Other reggae musicians that have been accused of promoting anti-gay lyrics include Beenie Man, Elephant Man, Shabba Ranks and Sizzla.

See also
 List of reggae musicians
 List of roots reggae artists
 List of ska musicians
 Music of Jamaica
 Reggae genres

ReferencesGeneral  Note: User must select the "Reggae" category as the genre under the search feature.Specific'''

 
1985 establishments in the United States
Awards established in 1985
Reggae Album